Nusrat Hussain (Urdu:نصرت حسین), is a Pakistani musician, airline pilot, guitarist, and keyboardist. He played guitar for the Vital Signs and keyboard for Junoon in the mid 1990s. He soon left both bands opting for a career in PIA as an airline pilot in airline industry. 

After his departure from Junoon, Nusrat released a solo album Amrit, which featured popular tracks such as Jo Chaho Tum and Teri Awaz. He made a comeback in 2015 with his album Kaho, which was a collaboration between him and music producer Sarmad Ghafoor.

Nusrat Hussain currently captains Boeing 777 aircraft for Qatar Airways.

Discography

Albums 
 Amrit (1992)
 Kaho (2015)

Singles 
 Teri Awaz
Erum
 Jo Chaho Tum
 Crazy Lady

See also
List of Pakistani musicians

References

External links
Vital Signs – A Personal History by NFP

Living people
Pakistani pop singers
Pakistani composers
Junoon (band) members
Pakistani keyboardists
Pakistani rock guitarists
Commercial aviators
Pakistani aviators
Year of birth missing (living people)